Longtail Aviation is a charter airline based in St. George's, Bermuda and was formed in August 1999.

Fleet
The fleet consisted of the following aircraft (as of 22 April 2011):

 2 Dassault Falcon 900B
 1 Cessna Citation S/II
 1 Beech King Air 350
 1 Beech King Air 200
 1 Boeing 737-700BBJ (as of August 2019)
 2 Boeing 747-400F (as of December 2020)

Incidents and accidents 
  On 20 February 2021, a Longtail Boeing 747-412BCF jet cargoliner, registration VQ-BWT, operating as flight 6T5504/LGT5504, had an engine failure above the village of Meerssen, shortly after taking off from Maastricht Aachen Airport on the way to John F. Kennedy International Airport. Dropped turbine blades from the exploded Pratt & Whitney PW4056 jet engine lightly injured two persons on the ground. The plane was able to land safely at Liège Airport.

References

External links

Airlines established in 1999
Tourism in Bermuda
1999 establishments in British Overseas Territories